The Tsemperou is a mountain located in southern Arcadia, central Peloponnese, Greece. The elevation of its summit is 1,254 m. It is situated southeast of the plain of Megalopoli, 12 km from the town centre. Villages on the Tsemperou include Anavryto and Paparis. The river Alfeios flows north of the mountain.

References

Landforms of Arcadia, Peloponnese
Mountains of Greece
Mountains of Peloponnese (region)